Mauzac is a commune in the Haute-Garonne department in southwestern France.

Geography
The village lies on the middle banks of the Garonne river.

The commune is bordered by four other communes: Le Fauga to the north, Beaumont-sur-Lèze to the east, Montaut to the south, and finally by Noé to the west.

Population

See also
Communes of the Haute-Garonne department

References

Communes of Haute-Garonne